Victoria Fleetwood (born 13 April 1990) is a rugby union player and personal trainer. She represented  at the 2014 Women's Rugby World Cup and the 2017 Women's Rugby World Cup.

International career 
Fleetwood made her England debut in 2011. She made six appearances in the 2014 Women's Rugby World Cup, which England won. In 2017 she made three appearances for England at the Women's Rugby World Cup, including in the final which England lost to New Zealand.

After the 2017 World Cup, she switched to England 7s, competing for England in the 2018 Commonwealth Games; the team took the bronze medal.

She returned to 15s in 2019 as England won the 2019 Women's Six Nations. She was injured out of the 2019 Women's Rugby Super Series, but was named Player of the Match in the Quilter International match versus Italy later that year.

Fleeetwood was again part of the England team as they won the 2020 Women's Six Nations.

Club career 
Aged 14, Fleetwood began playing for Leicester Forest. She joined Lichfield aged 17 as part of the Under 18s squad, and later graduated to the seniors team. She continued to play for Lichfield while attending university with teammate Emily Scarratt.

She joined Saracens Women in 2014, then rejoined the team in 2020.

Early life 
Born in Hinckley in 1990, Fleetwood has a twin brother named Andrew. She was a junior hurdler and sprinter before switching to rugby.

She attended John Cleveland College and then Leeds Metropolitan University. Alongside rugby, Fleetwood is a successful personal trainer.

In 2017 she appeared on the cover of Stylist magazine as part of a feature on the England Women's Rugby team.

References

External links
 RFU player profile

1990 births
Living people
Commonwealth Games bronze medallists for England
Commonwealth Games medallists in rugby sevens
England women's international rugby union players
English female rugby union players
Rugby sevens players at the 2018 Commonwealth Games
Rugby union players from Nuneaton
England international women's rugby sevens players
Saracens Women rugby players
Medallists at the 2018 Commonwealth Games